Frank Molnar (1936-2020) was a Hungarian-born Canadian artist. Fleeing to the United States as a result of the Hungarian Revolution of 1956, he studied at the Pennsylvania Academy of Fine Arts before moving to Vancouver, Canada in 1962. An oil painter and watercolourist, he was one of the first instructors at Capilano College's art and design college, where one of his students was Charles van Sandwyk.

References

Further reading
 

1936 births
2020 deaths
20th-century Hungarian artists
20th-century Canadian artists
Pennsylvania Academy of the Fine Arts alumni
Academic staff of Capilano University